The FNRS-1 was a balloon, built by Auguste Piccard, that set a world altitude record. It was named after the Belgian Fonds National de la Recherche Scientifique, which funded the balloon.

See also
 National Fund for Scientific Research
 FNRS-2, which was the first ever bathyscaphe built.
 FNRS-3, which was rebuilt from FNRS-2

References and notes

Sources

External links

Individual balloons (aircraft)
Aircraft manufactured in Belgium